The Georgia national football team represents Georgia in association football and is controlled by the Georgian Football Federation (GFF), the governing body of the sport there. It competes as a member of the Union of European Football Associations (UEFA), which encompasses the countries of Europe. Organised football has been played in the country since the 20th century. Georgia joined UEFA and the International Federation of Association Football (FIFA) in 1992; the country played two friendlies before joining. In 1990-91, due to succession from the Football Federation of the Soviet Union, football in Georgia was under sanctions from the Soviet federation and international ban. In its inspiration to independence from the Russian dominance, Georgia became the first Soviet republic which football parted with the Soviet football.

Georgia's first match—a 2–2 draw against Lithuania—took place on 27 May 1990 and was their only match as the Georgian Soviet Socialist Republic. Their first victory came in their next match, 4–2 against Moldova. They entered their first major international competition in 1994: the qualifying rounds for 1996 UEFA European Football Championship. The team won their first competitive match on 10 February 1994 when they defeated Malta 1–0 in the 1994 Rothmans International Tournament. Georgia made its first appearance in the qualifying rounds of the FIFA World Cup during the 1998 edition, but the country has yet to reach the finals of the World Cup or the European Football Championship.

The team's largest victory came on 30 March 1997 when they defeated Armenia by seven goals to nil in a friendly. Their worst loss is a 6–1 against Denmark in 2005. Georgia have also been defeated by five goals to nil against Romania in 1996. Levan Kobiashvili holds the appearance record for Georgia, having been capped 100 times during an international career that lasted 15 years. The goalscoring record is held by Shota Arveladze, who scored 26 times in 61 matches. As of April 2019, Georgia are ranked 94th in the FIFA World Rankings. Its highest ever ranking of 42nd was achieved in September 1998.

International matches

Key to background colours
 – indicates Georgia won the match
 – indicates Georgia's opposition won the match
 – indicates the match ended in a draw

1990

1991

1992

1993

1994

1995

1996

1997

1998

1999

2000

2001

2002

2003

2004

2005

2006

2007

2008

2009

2010

2011

2012

2013

2014

2015

2016

2017

2018

2019

All-time record

Updated to game played 12 October  2019.

Record by opponent
Georgia's first team has competed in a number of competitions and friendlies, and their record against each team faced in these competitions is listed below. Since their first official match against Lithuania in May 1990 Georgia have faced a total of 62 teams, they met their most recent different opponent, Andorra, for the first time in November 2018. The team that Georgia has met most is Albania, against whom they have contested 14 matches; having won eight of these Albania are also the side Georgia have beaten the most. Georgia have tied four games with Moldova, they are the team that they have drawn with the most. The team that has defeated Georgia the most are the Republic of Ireland, who have won nine of their ten matches with Georgia.

Record by competition

See also
Georgia national football team results (2020–present)

Notes

References
General
 
 
 

Specific

Georgia national football team results
Results
Association football in Georgia (country) lists